Maria Domenica Michelotti (born 8 October 1952 in Bourg-Saint-Maurice, France) served as a Captain Regent of San Marino from 1 April 2000 to 1 October 2000.  She served with Gian Marco Marcucci.

References

1952 births
20th-century women rulers
Captains Regent of San Marino
Members of the Grand and General Council
Female heads of state
Female heads of government
Sammarinese women in politics
French people of Sammarinese descent
Living people
20th-century French women